Tumpak Sewu, also known as Coban Sewu, is a tiered waterfall that is located between the Pronojiwo District, Lumajang Regency, and the Ampelgading District, Malang Regency, in East Java, Indonesia. The waterfall is overshadowed by Semeru, an active volcano and the highest mountain in Java. The Glidik River, which flows down Semeru, is the primary water source for the waterfall. Tumpak Sewu is loosely translated to mean "a thousand waterfalls" in the Javanese language. The name likely originated due to its appearance of many different waterfalls in one single, semi-circular area. 

Tumpak Sewu is a highly-visited tourist destination, primarily on the weekends. Infrastructure built around and inside the main box canyon has allowed for easier access to the area, although the trip to enter or exit is still physically demanding and may take around an hour to complete.

References

External links
 Location in Google Maps

Tiered waterfalls
Waterfalls of Indonesia